Foscombe is a grade II* listed country house in Ashleworth, Gloucestershire. It was built around 1860 in the Gothic Revival style for the personal use of the architect Thomas Fulljames.

References

External links 

Grade II* listed houses
Country houses in Gloucestershire
Thomas Fulljames buildings
Gothic Revival architecture in Gloucestershire
Borough of Tewkesbury